Richie Parsons is an Irish former football player during the 1990s and 2000s and is one of only 42 players to score 99 goals.

He made a scoring debut for Bray against Shamrock Rovers in the Leinster Senior Cup on 24 August 1988 His first of 100 league goals came on the opening day of the 1989–90 League of Ireland First Division season at Monaghan. Parsons made 2 substitute appearances against Trabzonspor in the 1990–91 European Cup Winners' Cup.

On 20 March 1994 Parsons scored 4 for Longford Town against St James's Gate F.C. The 1995-96 League of Ireland season was a rewarding one for Parsons and Bray. On the opening night Wanderers hammered Monaghan United 5–1 at Gortakeegan with Parsons scoring the very first league hat trick for a Bray Wanderers player. He scored a total of 55 goals in his 3 spells at the Carlisle Grounds.

Honours 
League of Ireland First Division
 Bray Wanderers A.F.C. 1995–96
League of Ireland First Division Shield
 Bray Wanderers A.F.C. 1995–96
F.A.I.CUP 1990
F.A.I.CUP 1999
Leinster Senior Cup 
Athlone Town 1992

References

1970 births
Living people
Association football forwards
Republic of Ireland association footballers
Association footballers from Dublin (city)
League of Ireland players
Bray Wanderers F.C. players
Athlone Town A.F.C. players
Longford Town F.C. players
Finn Harps F.C. players
Home Farm F.C. players